Intrigue is the sixth episode of the American television series Revenge. It premiered on ABC on October 26, 2011.

It was written by Dan Dworkin and Jay Beattie and directed by Tim Hunter.

Plot
On July 4, a celebration by the Grayson's family has long been legendary, but the celebration this year will be one to remember in a bad way. A videotape depicting Frank (Max Martini) killing Lydia Davis (Amber Valletta) at her penthouse destroys Frank's credibility to the Graysons.

Frank is not going to surrender without a fight, and it does not bode well for Emily Thorne (Emily VanCamp) & Nolan Ross' (Gabriel Mann) plans. Meanwhile, tensions between Emily and Tyler (Ashton Holmes) reach an all-time high, putting Daniel Grayson (Josh Bowman) into a difficult position, and Jack (Nick Wechsler) & Declan (Connor Paolo) take bold steps in pursuing Emily and Charlotte (Christa B. Allen).

Production
The episode was co-written by Dan Dworkin and Jay Beattie, while Mad Men veteran, Tim Hunter, directed.

Ratings
The episode scored a 2.7 adults 18-49 rating and 8.72 million viewers. Episode winning the 10pm hour time slot.

References

External links 
 

Revenge (TV series) episodes
2011 American television episodes